Adetaptera chapadensis is a species of beetle in the family Cerambycidae. It was described by Martins & Galileo in 1999.

References

Apomecynini
Beetles described in 1999